is a railway station on the Tsugaru Railway Line in the town of Nakadomari, Aomori, Japan, operated by the private railway operator Tsugaru Railway Company.

Lines

Station layout

The station has one side platform serving a single bidirectional line on a reversing headshunt. The station is staffed.

History
Tsugaru-Nakasato Station was opened on November 13, 1930.

Surrounding area
Former Nakasato Town Hall
Nakasato Post office

See also
 List of railway stations in Japan

External links

 

Railway stations in Aomori Prefecture
Tsugaru Railway Line
Nakadomari, Aomori
Railway stations in Japan opened in 1930